The gallery of a theatre is a form of balcony, an elevated platform generally supported by columns or brackets, which projects from the interior wall of a theatre, in order to accommodate additional audience.

It may specifically refer to the highest such platform, and carries the cheapest seats.

References

See also
Peanut gallery

Parts of a theatre